Gerpla is a 1952 Icelandic novel by Halldór Laxness based on the Old Icelandic Fóstbræðra saga.

Translations
 1954. Gerpla. Translated by Ingegerd Nyberg Fries. Stockholm: Litteraturfrämjandet.
 1958. The Happy Warriors. Translated by Katherine John. London: Methuen.
 1962. Gerpla: Hrdinská sága. Translated by Nina Neklanová. Jiskry: Nová beletristická knihovna 37. Prague: Nakladatelství politické literatury.
 1977. Gerpla: Eine Heldensage. Translated by Bruno Kress. Berlin: Aufbau.
 1988. Gerpla: Sága o hrdinoch. Translated by Jaroslav Kaňa. Bratislava: Slovenský spisovateľ.
 2016. Wayward Heroes. Translated by Phillip Roughton. New York: Archipelago Books.

Further reading
See Alec Shaw, '“The lore of skalds, warrior ideals, and tales of ancient kings”: A Bibliography on Gerpla', Scandinavian-Canadian Studies/Études scandinaves au Canada, 26 (2019), 320–25, and other articles in the same issue of the journal.

References

1952 novels
Icelandic novels
Novels by Halldór Laxness
Works based on sagas